The discography of American pop duo Donny and Marie Osmond contains seven studio albums, four compilation albums, one soundtrack album, one live album and 12 singles. Both siblings had previously had successful solo music careers before first collaborating in 1974; Donny was also a member of his brothers' band, The Osmonds. Their first single, "I'm Leaving It Up to You," reached number four on the Billboard Hot 100. Their corresponding debut album of the same name peaked at number 35 on the Billboard 200 chart in November 1974. The release certified gold in the United States for sales beyond 500,000 copies. Together, the duo had two more hits that reached both the top ten and 20 of the Hot 100: "Deep Purple" and "Morning Side of the Mountain." 

After the release of a second album, Donny and Marie began their own television show, also titled Donny & Marie. With its success, 1976's Featuring Songs from Their Television Show reached number 60 on the Billboard all-genre chart. The record also certified gold in the United States. Their fourth studio album, New Season (1977), reached number 85 in the United States. In 1978, the duo appeared in the film Goin' Coconuts. The soundtrack of the same name would later certify gold in sales. The duo continued their own solo careers for many years before reuniting in Las Vegas in the 2000s. With their return, the duo released a self-titled studio album, which was their first to chart on the Billboard Top Country Albums chart, peaking at number seven.

Albums

Studio albums

Soundtrack albums

Compilation albums

Live albums

Singles

Music videos

See also
 Donny Osmond discography
 Marie Osmond discography
 The Osmond Brothers discography
 Little Jimmy Osmond discography

Notes

References

External links
 Discography at Donny Osmond's official website

Discographies of American artists